Poltavsky Uyezd (Полтавский уезд) was one of the subdivisions of the Poltava Governorate of the Russian Empire. It was situated in the southeastern part of the governorate. Its administrative centre was Poltava.

Demographics
At the time of the Russian Empire Census of 1897, Poltavsky Uyezd had a population of 227,795. Of these, 88.7% spoke Ukrainian, 5.3% Russian, 5.1% Yiddish, 0.5% Polish, 0.2% German, 0.1% Tatar and 0.1% Belarusian as their native language.

References

 
Uezds of Poltava Governorate
Poltava Governorate